The 2005 J.League Cup, officially the 2005 J.League Yamazaki Nabisco Cup, was the 3rd edition of Japan association football league cup tournament and the 13th edition under the current J.League Cup format. The championship started on March 19, and finished on November 5, 2005.

Teams from the J1 took part in the tournament. Yokohama F. Marinos and Júbilo Iwata were given a bye to the quarter-final due to their qualification for the AFC Champions League. The rest of 16 teams started from the group stage, where they're divided into four groups. The group winners of each group qualifies for the quarter-final along with the 2 best runners-up, and the two teams which qualified for the AFC Champions League.

Group stage

Group A

Group B

Group C

Group D

Knockout stage

Quarter finals

First leg

Second leg

Semi finals

First leg

Second leg

Final

Top goalscorers

Awards 
 MVP:  Tomonori Tateishi (JEF United Chiba)
 New Hero Prize:  Yuki Abe (JEF United Chiba)

References 
 J.League Official Site 

2005 domestic association football cups
2005
Lea